Alan Hammond Nichols (born February 14, 1930) is an American attorney, author, explorer and authority on sacred mountains.  He was the 42nd president of The Explorers Club.

Life
Nichols was educated at Stanford University receiving a BA and election to Phi Beta Kappa in 1951.

From 1951 to 1954, he saw active service in Korea with the 47th Infantry Division of the U.S. Army, mustering out as a lieutenant with a commendation medal with four clusters.

Back to civilian life, Nichols returned to Stanford to study law getting his JD in 1955.  As a first-year law student he was selected for the Board of Editors of the Stanford Law Review.

After passing the bar, Nichols practiced law in the San Francisco area for over 50 years specializing in business, banking, finance, and non-profit companies. During this time he was actively involved in the governance of community organizations most notably the San Francisco Unified School District (SFUSD), City College of San Francisco, Prescott College, Cathedral (Elementary) School, Webb (High) School, the graduate school of California College, and the Ewald Foundation.  During his tenure as president of SFUSD he was named respondent in the landmark 1974 civil rights case Lau v. Nichols, where the Supreme Court found for the students.

Nichols has been active in campaigning and fund raising for the Republican party in his home state of California. In 1990, he ran unsuccessfully for Congress from the 5th District of California against Democrat Nancy Pelosi.

Throughout his life his interest in spirituality, religion and culture have inspired Nichols to travel the world and in doing so to attain many notable firsts.  Among these, in 1978 when China opened the Tibet Autonomous Region for tourism he was the first Westerner to have permission to make pilgrimages to the sacred Tibetan sites of Mount Kailash and Lake Manasarovar.  He has bicycled the entire 10,300 miles of the Silk Road from Istanbul to Xi’an, a journey completed in four legs beginning in 1989 and concluding in 2005.  In 2010 and 2012 he was the first to lead expeditions into little traveled areas of Ningxia, Inner Mongolia and China in search of the tomb of the great Mongol emperor Genghis Khan.
 
Nichols holds an honorary doctor of science degree from California College of Podiatric Medicine.
  
He resides in Marin County, California, with his wife Rebecca "Becky" Rygh-Nichols.

Selected publications
Nichols' written works include:

Non-fiction
Nichols, Alan H. & Rogers, Harold E. (1965). Water for California: Planning, Law & Practice, Finance. San Francisco: Bancroft-Whitney.  Hathi Trust Digital Library. .
Nichols, Alan (1988, March) "The Xinjiang-Tibet Mountain Bike Expedition." The Explorers Journal. Volume 66, Number 1.
Nichols, Alan H., Nichols, Nancy A. editor (1991). Journey: A Bicycle Odyssey through Central Asia. San Francisco: J.D. Huff & Company.  .
Nichols, Alan H., Nichols, Nancy A., editor (1992). Letters Home from the Lafayette Flying Corps. San Francisco: J.D. Huff & Company.  
Nichols, Alan H. (2002). Travels with Annie.  Sacred Mountain Press. 
Nichols, Alan H., editor (2003). Curriculum Guide for the Arts. The Ewald Foundation. Downloadable Version
Nichols, Alan H. (2003/4, Winter). "Cycling the Silk Road: A Central Asian Adventure." The Explorers Journal. Volume 84, Number 4.
Under pen name
Hammond, Alan (1978). A Gift from the Master. Las Vegas, NV: Illuminated Way Press. .
Hammond, Alan (1979). To Climb a Sacred Mountain: One Man's Search for God Atop the Holy Mountains of the World.  Las Vegas, NV: Illuminated Way Press.  
As contributor
Fok, Pat & Terrill, Ross (1974). Faces of China: Tomorrow, Today, Yesterday. Great Britain: Michael Joseph Limited. Contribution: Text on sacred mountains. 
Nichols, Nancy Ann (1991). San Quentin: Inside the Walls. San Francisco: San Quentin Museum Association. Contribution: Pictures, stories and history. 
Fiction
Nichols, Alan (2000). Adventures in Time (Poems from the 20th Century).  Belvedere, CA: The Rygh Corporation.  (c) Alan Nichols.

Under pen name
Hammond, Alan (1962). San Francisco Commuter. Poems. San Francisco: Pendragon Press.  
Hammond, Alan (2011). All's Fair in Love and Law: Small Town Tales of Life, Laughter and Litigation. Novel. United Kingdom: Orion Publishing.

References

External links
 The Explorers Club

1930 births
American explorers
American lawyers
Living people
People from Palo Alto, California
American male writers